This is a list of the complete squads for the rugby union 2021 Six Nations Championship contested annually by the national rugby teams of England, France, Ireland, Italy, Scotland and Wales. England are the defending champions.

Note: Number of caps and players' ages are indicated as of 6 February 2021 – the tournament's opening day. For players added to a squad during the tournament, their caps and age are indicated as of the date of their call-up.

England
On 22 January, Jones named a 28-man squad as well as a 12-man shadow squad for the Six Nations.

Head coach:  Eddie Jones

Shadow squad 

Call-ups
On 9 February, Kyle Sinckler and Mako Vunipola were called up to the squad, while Tom West and Harry Williams returned to their clubs. 
On 18 February, George Martin was called up to the squad, replacing the injured Jack Willis, who had been called into the full squad ahead of the match against Italy. 
On 21 February, Alex Mitchell was called up to the squad, replacing the injured Harry Randall. 
On 3 March, David Ribbans was called up to the squad, replacing the injured Courtney Lawes.

France
On 31 January 2021, Galthié named his official 31-man squad for the 2021 Six Nations Championship.

Head coach:  Fabien Galthié

Call-ups
On 9 February, Uini Antonio & Hassane Kolingar replaced Georges-Henri Colombe & Jean-Baptiste Gros. 
On 17 February, Demba Bamba, Jean-Baptiste Gros & Swann Rebbadj replaced Dorian Aldegheri, Hassane Kolingar & Baptiste Pesenti. 
On 21 February, following a COVID-19 outbreak in the French squad, Dorian Aldegheri, Teddy Baubigny, Jonathan Danty, Hassane Kolingar, Maxime Lucu, Yoram Moefana and Donovan Taofifénua replaced Antoine Dupont, Jean-Baptiste Gros, Mohamed Haouas, Julien Marchand, Swann Rebbadj, Gabin Villière and Arthur Vincent. 
On 22 February, following further COVID-19 cases, Gaëtan Barlot, Cyril Cazeaux, Thierry Paiva, Baptiste Pesenti and Thomas Ramos were called into the squad to replace Cyril Baille, Bruce Dulin, Peato Mauvaka, Charles Ollivon and Romain Taofifénua. 
On 7 March, Cyril Baille, Camille Chat, Brice Dulin, Antoine Dupont, Jean-Baptiste Gros, Mohamed Haouas, Wilfred Hounkpatin, Julien Marchand, Romain Ntamack, Charles Ollivon, Romain Taofifénua and Virimi Vakatawa were added to the squad, while Uini Atonio, Demba Bamba, Pierre-Louis Barassi, Gaëtan Barlot, Teddy Baubigny, Louis Carbonel, Kilian Geraci, Hassane Kolingar, Maxime Lucu, Thierry Paiva, Baptiste Pesenti and Thomas Ramos were withdrawn. 
On 9 March, Swan Rebbadj replaced Bernard Le Roux in the squad, who was ruled out with injury. 
On 16 March, Uini Atonio and Arthur Vincent were called into the squad, while Jonathan Danty and Wilfrid Hounkpatin were withdrawn. 
On 22 March, Louis Carbonel replaced Matthieu Jalibert in the squad.

Ireland
On 25 January 2021, Farrell named a 36-man squad for the Six Nations.

Head coach:  Andy Farrell

Call-ups
On 2 February, Ryan Baird and Gavin Coombes replaced Caelan Doris and Quinn Roux due to injury. 
On 9 February, Ed Byrne and Jack Conan were called into the international squad, while Gavin Coombes returned to his club side. 
On 13 February, Harry Byrne and John Cooney were called into the squad as additional cover following injuries to Conor Murray and Johnny Sexton. 
On 21 February, Harry Byrne and John Cooney returned to their club sides, while Peter O'Mahony was also ruled out due to suspension. 
On 8 March, Jacob Stockdale was called into the squad, while Shane Daly returned to his club side. 
On 15 March, Finlay Bealham and Peter O'Mahony were called into the squad, while Tom O'Toole, Garry Ringrose and James Ryan were released due to injury.

Italy
On 25 January 2021, Smith named a 32-man squad and five invited players for the Six Nations.

Head coach:  Franco Smith

Invited players 

Call-ups
On 8 February, Pierre Bruno and Andrea Lovotti were added to the squad, while Marco Zanon withdrew due to injury. 
On 15 February, Marco Zanon returned to the squad after overcoming injury. 
On 22 February, it was announced that Daniele Rimpelli and Cristian Stoian had returned to their club sides. 
On 2 March, Edoardo Padovani, Daniele Rimpelli and Marcello Violi were added to the squad, while Pierre Bruno, Guglielmo Palazzani and Cherif Traorè returned to their clubs. Andrea Zambonin was also invited to train with the side. 
On 8 March, Oliviero Fabiani was called up to the squad, while Riccardo Favretto returned to his club. 
On 15 March, Pierre Bruno, Riccardo Favretto were called into the squad and Andrea Zambonin was called into the main squad, while Tommaso Allan, Marco Lazzaroni, Marco Manfredi and Luca Sperandio were released.

Scotland
On 20 January, Townsend named a 35-man squad for the Six Nations.

Head coach:  Gregor Townsend

Invited players 

Call-ups
On 8 February, D'Arcy Rae, Charlie Shiel and George Taylor were called into the squad, while Ewan Ashman, Jamie Dobie, Blair Kinghorn and Rufus McLean returned to their clubs. 
On 21 February, Ewan Ashman, Josh Bayliss, Jamie Bhatti, Jamie Dobie, Cornell du Preez, Rob Harley, Adam Hastings and Sam Johnson were called into the squad, while Allan Dell, Gary Graham, Byron McGuigan, D'Arcy Rae, Cameron Redpath, Charlie Shiel, George Taylor, Blade Thomson and Zander Ferguson were withdrawn. Matt Currie and Ben Muncaster were also invited to train with the squad. 
On 8 March, Nick Haining, Sam Skinner and Rufus McLean were called into the squad, while Josh Bayliss, Richie Gray, Adam Hastings, Ben Muncaster and Grant Stewart were withdrawn. Rory Darge and Max Williamson were also invited to train with the squad. 
On 15 March, Zander Ferguson, Damien Hoyland and Ally Miller were called into the squad, while Scott Cummings, Rufus McLean and Max Williamson were withdrawn. Alex Samuel was also invited to train with the squad. 
On 22 March, Adam Hastings, Rufus McLean and Grant Stewart were called into the squad, while Ewan Ashman, Jamie Bhatti, Matt Currie, Rory Darge, Cornell du Preez, Jonny Gray, Damien Hoyland, James Lang, Sean Maitland, Ally Miller, Alex Samuel and Duncan Taylor were withdrawn.

Wales
On 20 January, Pivac named a 36-man squad for the Six Nations.

Head coach:  Wayne Pivac

Call-ups
On 10 February, James Botham, Willis Halaholo and Lloyd Williams were called into the squad, while Dan Lydiate withdrew due to injury. 
On 19 February, WillGriff John was called into the squad, with Dillon Lewis withdrawing through injury. Josh Macleod was also withdrawn from the squad following injury in the lead up to the match against Scotland. 
On 4 March, Kieran Hardy was released from the squad due to injury.

References

squads
2021 Squads